Ugoszcz  is a village in the administrative district of Gmina Miedzna, within Węgrów County, Masovian Voivodeship, in east-central Poland.

In 1827, the village had a population of 117.

References

Ugoszcz